Miehm is a surname. Notable people with the surname include:

Grant Miehm Canadian illustrator 
Kevin Miehm (born 1969), Canadian ice hockey player